Love in Bloom is a 1935 American comedy film directed by Elliott Nugent and written by Frank R. Adams, J.P. McEvoy, John P. Medbury and Keene Thompson. The film stars George Burns, Gracie Allen, Joe Morrison, Dixie Lee, J. C. Nugent, Lee Kohlmar and Richard Carle. The film was released on March 15, 1935, by Paramount Pictures.

Plot

Colonel Downey, a carnival owner, goes bankrupt and lands in jail. His daughter-in-law Gracie Downey decides to travel to New York City to find George's sister Violet and ask for financial aid. George goes along with Gracie, and together they find Vi dining with songwriter Larry Deane, unaware that both Vi and Larry don't have a dollar left between them.

Vi and Larry each get a job in Pop Heinrich's music store, where she turns out to be good at sales by singing songs to customers with Larry's accompaniment. Vi is able to get her belongings back from the apartment where she was locked out, but gives what's left of her money to Gracie, then decides to go to work for the carnival. Larry then decides to use his earnings to become one of the carnival's new owners.

Cast 
George Burns as George
Gracie Allen as Gracie Downey
Joe Morrison as Larry Deane
Dixie Lee as Violet Downey
J. C. Nugent as Col. 'Dad' Downey
Lee Kohlmar as Pop Heinrich
Richard Carle as Sheriff

References

External links 
 

1935 films
American comedy films
1935 comedy films
Paramount Pictures films
Films directed by Elliott Nugent
American black-and-white films
1930s English-language films
1930s American films